Bitburg Airport  is a commercial airport serving Bitburg, a city in the Rhineland-Palatinate state of Germany.

History
From 1952 until 1994, Bitburg Air Base was a front-line NATO air base. It was the home of the United States Air Force's 36th Tactical Fighter Wing for over 40 years as part of the United States Air Forces in Europe (USAFE).

Under contract with the United States Air Force, the French Army began construction of what would become the base in Western Germany's Eifel Mountains in early 1951. Located in the French occupation zone, construction began on farm land that had been a Wehrmacht tank staging and supply area for the Battle of the Bulge in late 1944.

In July 1952, the 53rd Fighter-Bomber Squadron from the 36th Wing moved from Fürstenfeldbruck Air Base a few miles west of Munich and arrived at the newly built base. Throughout the summer, elements of the 36th FBW moved into Bitburg, with the wing officially arriving in November 1952.

With the end of the Cold War, it was deemed that Bitburg AB was no longer needed as a military base and it was turned over to the German government on 1 October 1994. Between June and September 1997, it was necessary to repair the Spangdahlem Air Base runway and that called for a temporary location to accommodate the 52d Fighter Wing's three squadrons of F-15s and F-16s. Bitburg Airport was the most logical place—only  down the road. The USAF departed for the second time in September 1997 and Bitburg Airport was returned to use by the civil aircraft which now call it home.

On September 15, 2008, the Ministry of Transport of Rhineland-Palatinate granted the airport contractor landing rights for aircraft with a maximum takeoff weight of more than 14 tonnes. The airport contracting company is currently evaluating plans to develop the airport into a regional freight airport.

Airlines and destinations
There are no scheduled airline services to and from Bitburg Airport.

Nearby Air Force support community
Although the airport was officially returned to the German government the United States held on to the land annexed for housing soldiers and their families. This land was designated to extra housing for airmen and their families, numerous support facilities, such as schools, a commissary, and hospital. The intention to return these facilities was always the plan, but unknown when it would take place. In May 2017 the Bitburg base's high school was officially closed after over 60 years in operation. This marked the beginning the return of the land to Germany. The task of preparing the base was put to the U.S. armed forces. After families were relocated and buildings prepared to be returned in November 2017 the base had a small ceremony to commemorate the end of United States military presence since 1952. After the ceremony the last military personnel left the base officially handing over the community back to the German Government.

See also
 Transport in Germany
 List of airports in Germany

References

Citations

Bibliography
 Donald, David (2004) Century Jets: USAF Frontline Fighters of the Cold War. AIRtime 
 Fletcher, Harry R. (1989) Air Force Bases Volume II, Active Air Force Bases outside the United States of America on 17 September 1982. Maxwell AFB, Alabama: Office of Air Force History. 
 Martin, Patrick (1994). Tail Code: The Complete History of USAF Tactical Aircraft Tail Code Markings. Schiffer Military Aviation History. .
 Maurer, Maurer (1983). Air Force Combat Units Of World War II. Maxwell AFB, Alabama: Office of Air Force History. .
 Menard, David W. (1998). Before Centuries: USAFE Fighters, 1948–1959. Schiffer Military Books 
 Mueller, Robert (1989). Active Air Force Bases Within the United States of America on 17 September 1982. USAF Reference Series, Maxwell AFB, Alabama: Office of Air Force History. 
 Ravenstein, Charles A. (1984). Air Force Combat Wings Lineage and Honors Histories 1947–1977. Maxwell AFB, Alabama: Office of Air Force History. .
 Rogers, Brian (2005). United States Air Force Unit Designations Since 1978. Hinkley, England: Midland Publications. .
 USAAS-USAAC-USAAF-USAF Aircraft Serial Numbers--1908 to present
 Mindling, George and Bolton, Robert (2008). US Air Force Tactical Missiles 1949-1969 The Pioneers. Lulu Press .

External links
 Official website
 Bitburg Air Base Closure
 Bitburg Barons Alumni Association
 Reunion Website for the 36th TFW and Bitburg Air Base
 Bitburg AB Photo Website
 F-100s of 36th TFW (via F-100.org
 Tactical Missile Units at Bitburg
 Bitburg F-4s
 TAC Missileers - Matador and Mace Missileers
 

Airports established in 1952
Airports in Rhineland-Palatinate
1952 establishments in West Germany